Vanessa Bell Calloway ( Bell; born March 20, 1957) is an American actress. Beginning her career as a dancer, Bell Calloway became known for her film roles as Princess Imani Izzi in the 1988 comedy Coming to America, as well as for her roles in What's Love Got to Do with It (1993), The Inkwell (1994), Crimson Tide (1995), and Daylight (1996). Bell Calloway had several starring roles on television series and movies, include first African American prime time soap opera, Under One Roof (1995). She later played recurring roles on Hawthorne and Shameless. In 2016, she appeared in comedy-drama film Southside with You, and began starring as Lady Ella Johnson in the Bounce TV prime time soap opera, Saints & Sinners. Bell Calloway is a nine-time NAACP Image Award nominee.

Early life 
Bell was born on March 20, 1957, in Cleveland, Ohio. She received a Bachelor of Fine Arts from Ohio University, where she became a member of Alpha Kappa Alpha sorority. Calloway also studied dance with Alvin Ailey, George Faison, and Otis Sallid. Calloway began her career as a dancer in Michael Bennett's original Broadway production of Dreamgirls. It was during this time period that Calloway directed the music video "Angel Man" for soul singer Rhetta Hughes. She also was in the ensemble of the short-lived musical Bring Back Birdie.

Career
Bell Calloway began her acting career in the ABC daytime soap opera, All My Children in 1985. After moving to Los Angeles in 1986, she began appearing in episodes of prime time shows such as The Colbys, Falcon Crest, 227, China Beach, A Different World, and L.A. Law. She made her film debut on Number One with a Bullet (1987), before supporting role of Eddie Murphy's character's arranged wife in the 1988 comedy Coming to America. In 1990, she co-starred alongside Joe Morton in the ABC drama series, Equal Justice. During the 1990s, she had number of supporting roles in films, including What's Love Got to Do with It (1993) opposite Angela Bassett, The Inkwell (1994), and Crimson Tide (1995) as Denzel Washington's character wife. She also voiced a leading role in the 1992 dystopian animated film, Bébé's Kids. She had number of leading and supporting roles in the made for television movies. In 1995, she co-starred opposite James Earl Jones and former co-star Joe Morton in the short-lived CBS prime time soap opera, Under One Roof, the first drama series that feature an African-American lead characters. For her role on the series, Calloway was nominated for the NAACP Image Award for Outstanding Actress in a Drama Series. She also had the leading roles on the short-leved NBC sitcom Rhythm & Blues (1992–93), and starred alongside Larry Hagman as his girlfriend in the CBS drama Orleans (1997).
 

In the 2000s, she had recurring roles on Boston Public and The District. She co-starred in films including The Brothers, All About You,  Dawg, Biker Boyz, Love Don't Cost a Thing, and Cheaper by the Dozen. Bell Calloway also guest starred on The Division, Strong Medicine, The Closer, CSI: Crime Scene Investigation, Dexter, Rizzoli & Isles, and Castle. From 2010 to 2011, she had a recurring role in the TNT medical drama, Hawthorne. In 2011, she began appearing in the Showtime comedy-drama, Shameless.

In 2016, she was cast as lead character in the Bounce TV first prime time soap opera, Saints & Sinners as Lady Ella Johnson, the widow of pastor and manipulative "First Lady of the Church". Also in 2016, Bell Calloway co-starred as president Obama's future mother-in-law, Marian Shields Robinson, opposite Tika Sumpter as Michelle Obama, in the comedy-drama film Southside with You, which premiered at the 2016 Sundance Film Festival. She guest starred on the ABC medical drama Grey's Anatomy.

In 2018, she appeared in the Christian drama film Unbroken: Path to Redemption and the crime thriller Dragged Across Concrete. In 2019, she played abolitionist Harriet Tubman's mother in the biographical drama film Harriet. She reprised her role as Imani Izzi in the 2021 sequel, Coming 2 America.

Personal life 
Vanessa Bell married  anesthesiologist Dr. Anthony Calloway in 1988. The couple have two daughters, Ashley and Alexandra. Ashley was one of the stars of the BET series Baldwin Hills which originally ran from 2007 until 2009.

In 2009, Bell Calloway was diagnosed with ductal carcinoma, an early stage of breast cancer. She underwent two lumpectomies, and then a mastectomy. She subsequently underwent reconstructive surgery, in which tissue from her stomach was used to reconstruct her breast. She recounted her experience in an October 2015 essay in Ebony magazine, by which point she had been cancer-free for six years.

Filmography

Film and TV Movies

Television

Awards and nominations

References

External links 

 
 
 

1957 births
Living people
African-American female dancers
20th-century American actresses
21st-century American actresses
20th-century African-American women
20th-century African-American people
21st-century African-American women
21st-century African-American people
American female dancers
American dancers
African-American dancers
American television actresses
American film actresses
American soap opera actresses
American voice actresses
Actresses from Cleveland
Ohio University alumni
African-American actresses